The Lok Janshakti Party (Ram Vilas) is an Indian political party formed in 2021 under the leadership of Chirag Paswan. It has recently been allotted a new symbol by the Election Commission, separate from the main Lok Janshakti Party. It is now one of two separate factions, the other being the Rashtriya Lok Janshakti Party. In January 2022, Bhartiya Sablog Party merged into it.

Electoral History

Nagaland 
LJP(RV) fielded candidates in 15 seats. Out of which 2 candidates won from Pughoboto and Tobu and came second in 8 other seats. Party also get 'state party' status in Nagaland with around 8.65% of total votes.

References

External links 

State political parties in Bihar
Political parties in India
Political parties established in 2021
Lok Janshakti Party